William Patrick Barr (3 February 1878 – 5 September 1945) was an Australian rules footballer who played with Essendon in the Victorian Football League (VFL).

'Snowy' Barr then played four games and kicked two goals for Williamstown in the VFA in 1899 before crossing to Essendon Town/Association Club in 1900.

Notes

External links 
		

1878 births
1945 deaths
Australian rules footballers from Victoria (Australia)
Essendon Football Club players
Essendon Association Football Club players
Williamstown Football Club players